Orrs Springs (formerly, Orr's Hot Sulphur Springs and Orrs) is a set of springs around which grew a resort and a stagecoach station in Mendocino County, California.
It is located  almost directly north of Boonville, at an elevation of 1001 feet (305 m). However, it is accessible from Ukiah by following Orr Springs Rd.

The Orrs post office operated from 1889 to 1911 and from 1915 to 1933. The name honored Samuel Orr, an early settler. Orr's son established a stage station and a resort that still exists as Orr Hot Springs Resort.

References

Reference bibliography 

Hot springs of California
Unincorporated communities in California
Unincorporated communities in Mendocino County, California